The Jones Gang are an English rock band, formed in London in 2001 by the English drummer and ex-Small Faces and The Who member Kenney Jones, plus ex-Foreigner member Rick Wills and British vocalist ex-Bad Company member Robert Hart.

Members

Main lineups
 Kenney Jones – drums (2001–present)
 Robert Hart – lead vocals (2001–present)
 Jim Stapley – vocals (2013–present)
 Mark Read – vocals (2014–present)
 Pat Davey – bass guitar (2017–present)
 Johnson Jay – lead guitar (2014–present)
 Sam Tanner - keys/vocals (2016-present)

Former members
 Rick Wills – bass guitar (2001–2017)
 Dave "Bucket" Colwell – lead guitar (2001–2014)

Discography
 Any Day Now (2005)

References

External links
youtube: "Angel" - The Jones Gang - Billboard No. 1 Single (not to be taken literally)
youtube: Kenney Jones Interview in Carnaby St.

Musical groups established in 2001
English rock music groups
Musical groups from London